Washington Park station may refer to:

 Washington Park station (MetroLink), a light rail station in East St. Louis, Illinois
 Washington Park station (Newark Light Rail), a light rail station in Newark, New Jersey
 Washington Park station (TriMet), a light rail station in Portland, Oregon